The Ashanti flag is the national flag of the Ashanti people. It depicts the Golden Stool (Ashanti: Sika' dwa), the throne of the Asantehene.

History 
In the early 1950s, the Ashanti flag was green, gold and black, with a cocoa pod and a porcupine on it. In 1956, the National Liberation Movement proposed a yellow flag with a black, white and green tricolour canton as the flag of an autonomous Ashanti kingdom.

Symbolism
The Ashanti flag has three horizontal stripes: gold for mineral wealth, black for the Ashanti people, and green for the forests.

The emblem in the centre is the Golden Stool, a symbol of national unity and royal authority since the 18th century. According to legend, the Stool descended from heaven in a cloud of white dust and landed in the lap of the first Ashanti Emperor Osei Tutu I. It is said to possess the sunsum (soul) of the Ashanti people.

A different version of the flag shows the gyemirekutu kyɛ, a hat made up of multiple different animal parts.

References

National flags
Ashanti people